ALPAL-2 is a submarine telecommunications cable system in the Mediterranean Sea linking Algeria and the Spanish Balearic island of Majorca.

It has landing points in:
El Djemila, Algiers, Algeria
Ses Covetes, Palma de Mallorca, Majorca, Spain

It has a design transmission capacity of 160 Gbit/s, starting operation at 5 Gbit/s and a total cable length of 312 km.  It started operation in July 2002.

References
 

Submarine communications cables in the Mediterranean Sea
Algeria–Spain relations
2002 establishments in Algeria
2002 establishments in Spain